Mud Creek may refer to:

Georgia
 Mud Creek (Chattahoochee River), a stream in Georgia
 Mud Creek (Clear Creek tributary), a stream in Georgia
 Mud Creek (Noses Creek tributary), a stream in Georgia

Missouri
 Mud Creek (Gasconade River), a stream in Missouri
 Mud Creek (Logan Creek), a stream in Missouri
 Mud Creek (Middle Fork Salt River), a stream in Missouri
 Mud Creek (Ramsey Creek), a stream in Missouri
 Mud Creek (St. Francois County, Missouri), a stream in Missouri

Other locations
 Mud Creek Glacier, California
 Mud Creek (Henry County, Illinois)
 Mud Creek (New York), a creek in Tompkins County, New York
 Mud Creek (Toronto), a creek in Toronto, Ontario
 Mud Creek (Chillisquaque Creek tributary), a stream in Pennsylvania
 Mud Creek (Tennessee River), a stream in Tennessee
 Mud Creek (Angelina River), a stream in Texas
 Mud Creek (Kinney County, Texas)
 Mud Creek (Kansas), a stream in Dickinson County, Kansas
 Stillman Creek (Illinois), a previous name

See also 
Mud Lake (disambiguation)